A thermoacidophile is an extremophilic microorganism that is both thermophilic and acidophilic; i.e., it can grow under conditions of high temperature and low pH. The large majority of thermoacidophiles are archaea (particularly the Thermoproteota and "Euryarchaeota") or bacteria, though occasional eukaryotic examples have been reported. Thermoacidophiles can be found in hot springs and solfataric environments, within deep sea vents, or in other environments of geothermal activity. They also occur in polluted environments, such as in acid mine drainage.

An apparent tradeoff has been described between adaptation to high temperature and low pH; relatively few examples are known that are tolerant of the extremes of both environments (pH < 2, growth temperature > 80°C). Many thermoacidophilic archaea have aerobic or microaerophilic metabolism, although obligately anaerobic examples (e.g. the Acidilobales) have also been identified.

Sequencing the genome of a thermoacidophilic eukaryote, the red algae Galdieria sulphuraria, revealed that its environmental adaptations likely originated from horizontal gene transfer from thermoacidophilic archaea and bacteria.

Further reading

References

Polyextremophiles
Thermozoa
Thermophiles